Troubridge Island Conservation Park is a protected area includes all of Troubridge Island and some adjoining waters about  East-southeast of Edithburgh in South Australia and about  southwest of Adelaide.  The park was proclaimed in 1982 under National Parks and Wildlife Act 1972 ‘to conserve sea-bird rookeries and to preserve heritage values of a lighthouse and associated keepers’ cottages’.  In 1986 the park was extended to include an area of intertidal waters around the island.  The conservation park is classified as an IUCN Category III protected area.

Citations and references

Citations

References

External links
Troubridge Island Conservation Park official webpage
Troubridge Island Conservation Park webpage on protected planet

Conservation parks of South Australia
South Australian terrestrial protected areas  with a  marine zone 
Protected areas established in 1982
Gulf St Vincent
Yorke Peninsula
1982 establishments in Australia